Galton is a surname and occasionally a given name. Notable people with the name include:

Surname
 Dorothy Galton (1901–1992), British university administrator
 Sir Douglas Strutt Galton (1822–1899), British engineer
 Emma Sophia Galton (1811–1904), English author 
 Francis Galton (1822–1911), English Victorian polymath
 Frank Wallace Galton (1867–1952), English political writer and journalist
 Jim Galton (born 1945), American business executive
 Leah Galton (born 1994, English footballer
 Mary Anne Schimmelpenninck (née Galton, 1778–1856), British writer in the anti-slavery movement
 Peter Galton (born 1942), British vertebrate paleontologist
 Ray Galton (1930–2018), British scriptwriter
 Samuel Galton (disambiguation), multiple people, including:
Samuel Galton, Jr. (1753–1832), British arms manufacturer
Samuel Tertius Galton (1783–1844), British businessman and scientist

Given name
 Galton Blackiston (born 1962), English chef

English masculine given names
Surnames